Shorsha is a rural locality (a village) in Kochyovskoye Rural Settlement, Kochyovsky District, Perm Krai, Russia. The population was 39 as of 2010. There are 5 streets.

Geography 
Shorsha is located 11 km south of Kochyovo (the district's administrative centre) by road. Durovo is the nearest rural locality.

References 

Rural localities in Kochyovsky District